Alexander Júnior Ponce Pardo (born 16 February 1994) is a Peruvian footballer who plays for Santos de Nasca.

Career

Early years
He started his career playing as a youth in the Academia Cantolao. Then he went on to the C.F. Pachuca from Mexico and in the year 2012 he signed for the Club Alianza Lima of Peru. He was invited to pass tests in FC Barcelona and Schalke 04 but nothing concrete.

Club career 
At the end of 2012, he was registered by the Hoffenheim from the Bundesliga, until 2016. In January, 2013, it was on loan for six months to the Esporte Clube Pelotas of the Brazilian league.

After his step into the fourth division of the Brazilian football, he was given in loan again in Alianza Lima for the season 2013. He had a brief step into Portuguese football out on loan with, Vitória Setúbal, after that, he went back to Peru football league, this time in USMP ( Club Deportivo Universidad de San Martin de Porres )

International career 
He has been international with Sub -17 Peruvian national team. He played some games with the U-20 Peruvian national team but was removed for disciplinary reasons.

References

External links

1994 births
Living people
Sportspeople from Callao
Association football defenders
Peruvian footballers
Peruvian expatriate footballers
Academia Deportiva Cantolao players
C.F. Pachuca players
TSG 1899 Hoffenheim players
Esporte Clube Pelotas players
Club Alianza Lima footballers
Vitória F.C. players
Club Deportivo Universidad de San Martín de Porres players
Universidad Técnica de Cajamarca footballers
Peruvian Primera División players
Primeira Liga players
Peruvian expatriate sportspeople in Mexico
Peruvian expatriate sportspeople in Germany
Peruvian expatriate sportspeople in Brazil
Peruvian expatriate sportspeople in Portugal
Expatriate footballers in Mexico
Expatriate footballers in Germany
Expatriate footballers in Brazil
Expatriate footballers in Portugal